

Ealdwulf (fl. 750–765) was a medieval Bishop of Lindsey.

Notes

References

External links
 

Bishops of Lindsey
765 deaths
Year of birth unknown